The 2012–13 season was Accrington Stanley's 44th season in their existence. Along with competing in League One, the club also participated in the FA Cup, Football League Cup and Football League Trophy. The season covered the period from 1 July 2012 to 30 June 2013.

League Two

Standings

Results summary

Result round by round

Squad

Statistics

|-
!colspan="14"|Players currently on loan:

|-
!colspan="14"|Players that left during the season:

|}

Goalscoring record

Disciplinary record

Contracts

Transfers

In

Loans in

Out

Loans Out

Fixtures and Results

League Two

FA Cup

League Cup

League Trophy

References

2012-13
Acc